Joanna Katie Rowsell  MBE (born 5 December 1988) is a retired English cyclist on the Great Britain Cycling Team who competed on track and road.

Her greatest successes were the gold medals won in the women's team pursuit at the 2012 London Olympics and the 2016 Rio Olympics as well as five World Championship titles, four in the team pursuit (2008, 2009, 2012 and 2014) plus one in the individual pursuit at the 2014 World Championships.

She currently holds the World Record in the 3 km team pursuit.

Rowsell first came to national prominence as a winner of junior national competitions in 2005/2006.

Early life
Rowsell was born in Carshalton, in the London Borough of Sutton. She competed for Sutton in the London Youth Games.

She attended Cuddington Croft Primary School from 1993 to 2000 and Nonsuch High School for Girls from 2000 to 2007.

Career
Rowsell was picked up by British Cycling's Talent Team programme in 2004, after being tested at her school. Her first major wins came in 2005 and 2006. As a junior, she won the British National Track Championships pursuit in both these years, whilst in senior competition on the road she won the 2006 British National Women's Series competition. She represented the UK at the European and World Junior Track and Road Championships in these years.

In 2006, she also finished third in the British National Championship and subsequently signed for the professional team Global Racing for the 2007 season. In her first year as a senior, she finished third in the 3 km pursuit and the points race at the National Track Championships. On the road, she finished second in the British National Circuit Race Championships.

2008 saw Rowsell join the new Nicole Cooke-led Team Halfords Bikehut. She also continued to compete on the track, winning her first World Title at the 2008 World Championships in Manchester as part of the women's pursuit team.

In 2012, she won in preparation for the Olympics at the Track Cycling World Cup in London both the team pursuit and the individual pursuit in February. Rowsell was a member of the team pursuit squad alongside Dani King and Laura Trott, when they won the team pursuit event and set a new world record at the 2011–12 UCI Track Cycling World Cup in London. They broke the record again at the 2012 UCI Track Cycling World Championships. At the 2012 Summer Olympics in London, Rowsell won a gold medal for the team pursuit alongside King and Trott. Having already set world record times in both the qualifying and semi-finals in this event, the team also went on to set a new world record time of 3:14.051 in the final.

In 2013, Rowsell broke her collarbone at the London cycling festival but, five weeks later, after an operation and training on a Wattbike with a pillow on the bars, she won the Women's Pursuit on the track at the International Belgian Open in Ghent.

In September 2014 Rowsell announced that she would be leaving the Wiggle-Honda team and joining the Pearl Izumi Sports Tours International squad on a two-year deal from 2015. In 2016, Rowsell won a gold medal in the Team Pursuit at the Rio Olympics.

On 14 March 2017, Rowsell announced that she was retiring from the sport.  "The decision to step away has been the hardest I've ever had to make," she said. "I believe I have more to offer the world."

Personal life
Rowsell has alopecia areata, a condition resulting in hair loss.

She is A descendant of Jean Samuel Pauly.

She was appointed Member of the Order of the British Empire (MBE) in the 2013 New Year Honours for services to cycling.

Her younger brother Erick Rowsell is a road racing cyclist.

Rowsell married Daniel Shand in July 2015 and then competed as Joanna Rowsell Shand. The marriage ended in divorce in 2020.

After retirement, she studied human biology at Manchester Metropolitan University, before becoming a medical student at St. George's Hospital Medical School in 2020.

Major results

2005
 1st  Individual pursuit, National Junior Track Championships
2006
 1st  Individual pursuit, National Junior Track Championships
 1st National Women's Road Race Series
 3rd National Road Race Championships
2007
 2nd National Criterium Championships
 National Track Championships
3rd  Individual pursuit
3rd  Points race
2008
 1st  Team pursuit, UCI Track World Championships
 UCI Track Cycling World Cup
1st  Team pursuit – Manchester
1st  Team pursuit – Melbourne
1st  Individual pursuit – Melbourne
3rd  Individual pursuit – Manchester
 1st  National Criterium Championships
 National Road Championships
1st  Under–23
3rd Senior
UEC European U23 Track Championships
1st  Team Pursuit (with Lizzie Armistead and Katie Colclough)
3rd Individual Pursuit
2009
 1st  Team pursuit, UCI Track World Championships
 08–09 UCI Track Cycling World Cup
1st  Team pursuit – Copenhagen
3rd  Individual pursuit – Copenhagen
  09–10 UCI Track World Cup
1st  Team pursuit – Manchester
2nd  Team pursuit – Melbourne
2010
 3rd National Criterium Championships
2011
 1st  Team pursuit, UEC European Track Championships
 1st  Team pursuit, UCI Track World Cup
 National Track Championships
1st   Individual pursuit
1st   Team pursuit
3rd  Points race
2012
 1st  Team pursuit, Olympic Games
 1st  Team pursuit, UCI Track World Championships
 UCI Track World Cup
1st  Team pursuit
1st  Individual pursuit
2013
 1st  Team pursuit, UEC European Track Championships
1st Individual Pursuit, International Belgian Open
 1st  National Time Trial Championships
2014
 UCI Track World Championships
1st  Team pursuit
1st  Individual pursuit
 1st  Individual pursuit, Commonwealth Games
 1st  Team pursuit, UEC European Track Championships
 National Track Championships
1st  Team pursuit
3rd  Individual pursuit
2015
 1st  Team pursuit, UEC European Track Championships
1st Individual Pursuit, Revolution – Round 1, Derby
 1st  Team pursuit, National Track Championships
 1st Stage 2 Tour of the Reservoir
 2nd  Team pursuit, UCI Track World Championships
2016
 1st  Team pursuit, Olympic Games

See also
 2012 Summer Olympics and Paralympics gold post boxes

References

External links

 New Year Honours list: Stars of London 2012 given recognition
 BBC Wales – Raise Your Game – Joanna Rowsell
 BBC Sport: Generation 2012: Joanna Rowsell
 Cycling Weekly – Joanna Rowsell Rider Profile

1988 births
Living people
British cycling road race champions
Members of the Order of the British Empire
People from Sutton, London
People educated at Nonsuch High School
Cyclists at the 2012 Summer Olympics
Cyclists at the 2016 Summer Olympics
Olympic cyclists of Great Britain
English Olympic medallists
Olympic gold medallists for Great Britain
Olympic medalists in cycling
English female cyclists
Medalists at the 2012 Summer Olympics
Medalists at the 2016 Summer Olympics
Cyclists at the 2014 Commonwealth Games
Commonwealth Games gold medallists for England
UCI Track Cycling World Champions (women)
Commonwealth Games medallists in cycling
English track cyclists
People with alopecia universalis
Medallists at the 2014 Commonwealth Games